The Battle of Castillon between the forces of England and France took place on 17 July 1453 in Gascony near the town of Castillon-sur-Dordogne (later Castillon-la-Bataille). Historians regard this decisive French victory as marking the end of the Hundred Years' War. 

On the day of the battle, the English commander, John Talbot, 1st Earl of Shrewsbury, believing that the enemy was retreating, led his army in an attack on a fortified French encampment without waiting for reinforcements. Talbot then refused to withdraw even after realizing the strength of the French position, causing his men to suffer severe casualties from the French artillery. Castillon was a major European battle won through the extensive use of field artillery.

The battle led to the English losing almost all their holdings in France, especially Gascony (Aquitaine), an English possession for the previous three centuries. The balance of power in Europe shifted, and political instability ensued in England.

Background
The breakdown of the 1420 Treaty of Troyes began the final stage of the Hundred Years' War. This period from 1420 to 1453 is characterized by Anne Curry as the "wars of the Treaty of Troyes" for control of the crown of France.

After the 1451 French capture of Bordeaux by the armies of Charles VII, the Hundred Years' War appeared to be at an end. The English primarily focused on reinforcing their only remaining possession, Calais, and watching over the seas. After three hundred years of Plantagenet rule, the citizens of Bordeaux considered themselves as subjects of the English monarch and sent messengers to Henry VI of England demanding that he recapture the province.

On 17 October 1452, the Earl of Shrewsbury landed near Bordeaux with a force of 3,000 men. A feared and famous military leader, Talbot was rumoured to be seventy-five or eighty years old, but it is more likely that he was around sixty-six at the time. With the cooperation of the townspeople, Talbot easily took the city on 23 October. The English subsequently took control over most of western Gascony by the end of the year. The French had known an English expedition was coming, but had expected it to come through Normandy. After this surprise, Charles prepared his forces over the winter, and by early 1453 he was ready to counterattack.

Prelude
Charles invaded Guyenne with three separate armies, all headed for Bordeaux. Talbot received 3,000 additional men, reinforcements led by his fourth and favourite son, John, the Viscount Lisle. The French laid siege to Castillon (approximately 40 kilometres (25 mi) east of Bordeaux) on 8 July. Talbot acceded to the pleas of the town leaders, abandoning his original plan to wait at Bordeaux for more reinforcements, and set out to relieve the garrison.

The French army was commanded by committee; Charles VII's ordnance officer Jean Bureau laid out the camp to maximize French artillery strength. In a defensive setup, Bureau's forces built an artillery park out of range from Castillon's guns. According to Desmond Seward, the park "consisted of a deep trench with a wall of earth behind it which was strengthened by tree-trunks; its most remarkable feature was the irregular, wavy line of the ditch and earthwork, which enabled the guns to enfilade any attackers". The park included up to 300 guns of various sizes, and was protected by a ditch and palisade on three sides and a steep bank of the River Lidoire on the fourth.

Talbot left Bordeaux on 16 July. He outdistanced a majority of his forces, arriving at Libourne by sunset with only 500 men-at-arms and 800 mounted archers. The following day, this force defeated a small French detachment of archers stationed at a priory near Castillon. Despite earlier plans to wait for reinforcements, Talbot pressed his men onward to the French camp, believing the rest of his men would arrive soon.

Battle

Along with the morale boost of victory at the priory, Talbot also pushed forward because of reports that the French were retreating. However, the cloud of dust leaving the camp which the townsmen indicated as a retreat was in fact created by camp followers departing before the battle.

The English advanced but soon ran into the full force of the French army. Despite being outnumbered and in a vulnerable position, Talbot ordered his men to continue fighting. Historian A.J. Pollard suggests this seemingly reckless behaviour from Talbot may be due to the fact that his "pride and honour were at stake for he had already ordered his men to battle when he discovered the strength of the French position". The only Englishman who remained mounted in the battle, he also did not wear armour due to previous agreements with the French when he was released from captivity in Normandy.

According to David Nicolle, the battle itself was "highly characteristic of the period" with the strong field fortification of the French and the small-arms fighting of the battle. In many ways, this battle played out like the Battle of Crécy in "reverse". The French guns obliterated the advancing soldiers, with each shot reportedly killing six men at a time. Talbot's reinforcements continued to arrive at the battle, only to suffer the same fate in their turn. Despite the odds against the English, the battle lasted over an hour until a thousand-strong Breton cavalry force led by Peter II, Duke of Brittany, crashed into their right flank, sending them into retreat.

The battle ended in an English rout, and both Talbot and his son were killed. There is some debate over the circumstances of Talbot's death, but it appears that his horse was killed by a cannon shot, and its mass pinning him down, a French archer in turn killed him with an axe.

Aftermath
With Talbot's death, English authority in Gascony eroded and the French retook Bordeaux on 19 October. It was not apparent to either side that the period of conflict was over. In hindsight, the battle marks a decisive turning point in history, and is cited as the endpoint of the period known as the Hundred Years' War. This was a major European battle won through the extensive use of field artillery.

Henry VI of England lost his mental capacity in late 1453, which led to the outbreak of the Wars of the Roses in England. Some have speculated that learning of the defeat at Castillon led to his mental collapse. The English Crown lost all its continental possessions except for the Pale of Calais, which was the last English possession in mainland France, and the Channel Islands, historically part of the Duchy of Normandy and thus of the Kingdom of France. Calais was lost in 1558. The Channel Islands have remained British Crown Dependencies to the present day, except for their German occupation during World War II.

A casualty after the battle of Castillon was Pierre II de Montferrand, husband of Mary Plantagenet, illegitimate daughter of the Duke of Bedford and a granddaughter of Henry IV of England. While returning to France after being exiled in England, Montferrand was arrested and taken to Poitiers where he was tried by a commission. Having been found guilty he was beheaded and quartered, possibly on the orders of Charles VII, at Poitiers, in July 1454. Montferrand was one of only a few nobles known to have been executed for treason during the reign of Charles VII.

Notes

References
Curry, Anne. (1993). The Hundred Years War. New York: St. Martin's Press.

Lace, William W. (1994). The Hundred Years' War. San Diego: Lucent Books.
Nicolle, David. (2012). European Medieval Tactics (2): New Infantry, New Weapons, 1260–1500. Botley: Osprey Publishing.

Pollard, A. J. (1983). John Talbot and the War in France, 1427–1453. Atlantic Highlands, NJ: Humanities Press, Inc.
 
Seward, Desmond. (1978). The Hundred Years War: The English in France, 1337–1453. New York: Atheneum.
Wagner, John A. (2006). Encyclopedia of the Hundred Years War. Westport, CN: Greenwood Press.

Further reading
Allmand, C. T., ed. (1973). Society at War: The Experience of England and France During the Hundred Years War. New York: Harper & Row Publishers
Allmand, C. T. (1988). The Hundred Years War: England and France at war, c. 1300-c. 1450. New York: Cambridge Press.
 Burne, A. H. "The Battle of Castillon, 1453: the end of the Hundred Years War" History Today (Apr 1953) 3#4 pp 249–256.
Curry, Anne. (2003). The Hundred Years' War, 1337–1453. New York: Routledge.
Vale, M. G. A. (1970). English Gascony, 1399–1453: A Study of War, Government, and Politics during the Later Stages of the Hundred Years' War. New York: Oxford Press.
Wright, Nicholas. (1998). Knights and Peasants: The Hundred Years War in the French Countryside. Suffolk: Boydell.

External links

 Spectacle
 Castillon from French medieval history page
 A contemporary newsletter describing the battle 

1453 in England
1450s in France
Castillon 1453
Castillon 1453
History of Gironde
Castillon
Hundred Years' War, 1415–1453
Gascony